Maravarman Rajasimha II (r. c. 900–915 AD) was the last major king of the early medieval Pandya kingdom (6th–10th century AD) of south India. He was the son and successor of Parantaka Viranarayana (r. c. 880–900 AD). He is the donor of the Larger Sinnamanur Plates.

Rajasimha was the son of Parantaka Viranarayana and Vanavan Mahadevi (a Kongu Chera princess). Chola king Parantaka I (r. c. 907–55) invaded the Pandya territories in 910 AD and captured Madurai (hence the title "Madurai Konda", or the Conqueror of Madurai, for the Chola). Rajasimha II received help from the Sri Lankan king Kassapa V, still got defeated by the Cholas in the decisive battle of Velur.

Rajasimha fled the Pandya country and stayed in Sri Lanka for some years. He then found refuge in the Chera country, leaving even his royal insignia in Sri Lanka.

References

Pandyan kings
10th-century rulers in Asia
10th-century Indian monarchs